Sally's Shoulders is a 1928 American drama film directed by Lynn Shores and written by Lynn Shores and Randolph Bartlett. It is based on the 1927 novel Sally's Shoulders by Beatrice Burton. The film stars Lois Wilson, George Hackathorne, Huntley Gordon, Lucille Williams, Edythe Chapman and Ione Holmes. The film was released on October 14, 1928, by Film Booking Offices of America.

Cast       
Lois Wilson as Sally
George Hackathorne as Beau
Huntley Gordon as Hugh Davidson
Lucille Williams as Millie
Edythe Chapman as Emily
Ione Holmes as Mabel
Charles O'Malley as Billy
William Marion as Sheriff

References

External links
 

1928 films
1920s English-language films
Silent American drama films
1928 drama films
Film Booking Offices of America films
American silent feature films
American black-and-white films
Films directed by Lynn Shores
1920s American films